K. V. Narayana Swamy is a Janata Dal (Secular) political activist and a member of the Karnataka Legislative Council.

References

External links
K.V. Narayana Swamy (Asset & Criminal Declaration)

Living people
Members of the Karnataka Legislative Council
Janata Dal (Secular) politicians
Year of birth missing (living people)